Custio Clayton (born October 5, 1987) is a Canadian professional boxer who has held the WBA-NABA welterweight title since 2019. As an amateur he is a six-time Canadian national champion and represented Canada at the 2012 Olympics, where he reached the quarter-finals.

Amateur career
Clayton began training at his great-uncle's gym, City of Lakes Boxing Club in Dartmouth, Nova Scotia, and fought his first amateur bout at the age of 11. He took a break from boxing for two years at the age of 17 to finish high school. The 24-year-old Nova Scotian Olympian Clayton, along with Simon Kean, were the only two Canadian male boxers to qualify for the 2012 Olympics.

Clayton was a quarter-finalist and 5th-place finisher at welterweight at the 2012 American Boxing Olympic Qualification Tournament.  Five spots were available for qualification at welterweight and Custio qualified over the other quarter-finalists since his loss was to the eventual winner Myke Carvalho.  Qualification being dependent on how the winning opponents performed in later rounds was controversial and will not be used in future Olympics. At the 2012 Summer Olympics (results) Clayton became the first Canadian to win a boxing bout in 8 years when he beat Óscar Molina in the opening round. Then he beat the Australian Cameron Hammond, before losing to Fred Evans in the quarterfinal.

Professional career

Clayton officially joined the Groupe Yvon Michel (GYM) in November 2014. The Nova Scotia boxer has indeed accepted a contract with a maximum duration of three years, the latest of which is an option. His first professional fight will also take place on 19 December at division light middleweight in gala undercard featuring Adonis Stevenson in Quebec City.

On 28 January 2020,  Clayton scored an eighth-round knockout of Diego (El Chacarero) Ramirez and retain his WBA title.

Professional boxing record

References

External links

1987 births
Living people
Sportspeople from Dartmouth, Nova Scotia
Black Nova Scotians
Canadian male boxers
Black Canadian boxers
Welterweight boxers
Light-middleweight boxers
Boxers at the 2012 Summer Olympics
Olympic boxers of Canada
Boxers at the 2014 Commonwealth Games
Commonwealth Games competitors for Canada